Baron Sackville, of Knole in the County of Kent, is a title in the Peerage of the United Kingdom. It was created in 1876 for the Honourable Mortimer Sackville-West, with remainder, failing heirs male of his body, to his younger brothers the Hon. Lionel and the Hon. William Edward. Sackville-West was the fourth son of George Sackville-West, 5th Earl De La Warr and Elizabeth Sackville-West, Countess De La Warr and 1st Baroness Buckhurst, younger daughter and co-heir of John Sackville, 3rd Duke of Dorset.  On the death of the latter's cousin, Charles Sackville-Germain, 5th Duke of Dorset, in 1845, the dukedom and its subsidiary titles became extinct and the Sackville estates passed through Elizabeth to the West family who assumed the additional surname of Sackville by Royal licence. By arrangement, Mortimer Sackville-West succeeded to a substantial part of the estates, including Knole in Kent, which is still the seat of the Barons Sackville.

He was succeeded in the barony according to the special remainder by his brother Lionel, who became the second Baron. He had no legitimate male issue and, on his death, the title passed to his nephew, the third Baron. He was the son of the aforementioned William Edward.  He was succeeded by his younger brother, the fourth Baron. He was a major-general in the army.  On his death the title passed to his son, the fifth Baron, and then to the latter's cousin, the sixth Baron.  He was the eldest son of the Hon. Bertrand George Sackville-West, youngest brother of the fourth Baron.  the title is held by his nephew, the seventh Baron, who succeeded in 2004. He is the son of Hugh Rosslyn Inigo Sackville-West, younger brother of the sixth Baron.

The poet Vita Sackville-West was the daughter of the third Baron and his wife Victoria Sackville-West, daughter of the second Baron.

Barons Sackville (1876)
Mortimer Sackville-West, 1st Baron Sackville (1820–1888)
Lionel Sackville-West, 2nd Baron Sackville (1827–1908)
Lionel Edward Sackville-West, 3rd Baron Sackville (1867–1928)
Charles John Sackville-West, 4th Baron Sackville (1870–1962)
Edward Charles Sackville-West, 5th Baron Sackville (1901–1965)
Lionel Bertrand Sackville-West, 6th Baron Sackville (1913–2004)
Robert Bertrand Sackville-West, 7th Baron Sackville (b. 1958)

The heir apparent is the present holder's son Hon. Arthur George Sackville-West (b. 2000).

Arms

See also
Earl De La Warr
Duke of Dorset
Baroness Buckhurst
Vita Sackville-West
Victoria Sackville-West
Orlando: A Biography
Transactions involving actual peppercorns

Notes

Baronies in the Peerage of the United Kingdom
Noble titles created in 1876
Baron
Baron
 Baron
Peerages created with special remainders